Bothrops is a genus of highly venomous pit vipers endemic to the Neotropics. The generic name, Bothrops, is derived from the Greek words βόθρος, bothros, meaning "pit", and ώπς, ops, meaning "eye" or "face", together an allusion to the heat-sensitive loreal pit organs. Members of this genus are responsible for more human deaths in the Americas than any other group of venomous snakes. Currently, 48 species are recognized.

Description
Most are characterized by having a sharp canthus rostralis and an unelevated snout.

The arrangement of the scales on top of the head is extremely variable; the number of interorbital scales may be 3–14. Usually there are 7-9 supralabials and 9-11 sublabials. There are 21-29 rows of dorsal scales at midbody, 139-240 ventral scales, and 30-86 subcaudals, which are generally divided.

Common names
Lacépède originally applied the name "lanceheads"  to all of these snakes, which he considered conspecific. Thus, older writings, as well as popular and sometimes scientific writings (including the American Heritage, Merriam-Webster, and New Shorter Oxford dictionaries), still often call them fer-de-lance (French, "spearhead"). However, many scientists and hobbyists now restrict this name to the Martinican species, B. lanceolatus. Other common names include American lanceheads and American lance-headed vipers.

Geographic range
Bothrops species are found in northeastern Mexico (Tamaulipas) southward through Central and South America to Argentina. They also occur on the islands of Saint Lucia and Martinique in the Lesser Antilles, as well as on Ilha da Queimada Grande off the coast of Brazil. B. atrox is also found on the island of Trinidad in the Caribbean off the eastern coast of Venezuela.

Behavior

Most species are nocturnal, although a few found at higher altitudes are active during the day. Otherwise, they may be seen on cloudy days or during periods of rain. Most are terrestrial, though all are capable of climbing. One species, B. insularis, which is endemic to Ilha da Queimada Grande, is considered to be semi arboreal. This species, unlike most Bothrops, preys primarily on birds, due to the absence of native mammal species on Queimada Grande. This feeding habit probably accounts for their more arboreal lifestyle compared with their mainland cousins. Many species of Bothrops exhibit tail vibration behavior when disturbed.

Venom
Members of this genus are responsible for more fatalities in the Americas than any other group of venomous snakes. In this regard, the most important species are B. asper, B. atrox, and B. jararaca. Without treatment, the fatality rate is estimated to be about 7%, but with treatment this is reduced to 0.5-3%.

Typical symptoms of bothropic envenomation include immediate burning pain, dizziness, nausea, vomiting, sweating, headache, massive swelling of the bitten extremity, hemorrhagic blebs, local necrosis, bleeding from the nose and gums, ecchymosis, erythemia, hypotension, tachycardia, coagulopathy with hypofibrinogenemia and thrombocytopenia, hematemesis, melena, epistaxis, hematuria, intracerebral hemorrhage, and kidney failure, secondary to hypotension and bilateral cortical necrosis. There is usually some discoloration around the bite site, and rashes may develop on the torso or the extremities.

In general, death results from hypotension secondary to blood loss, kidney failure, and intracranial hemorrhage. Common complications include necrosis and kidney failure secondary to shock and the toxic effects of the venom.

Species

*) Not including the nominate subspecies.
T) Type species

References

External links
 

 
Snakes of South America
Snakes of Central America
Snake genera
Taxa named by Johann Georg Wagler